The 1991 World Table Tennis Championships women's singles was the 41st edition of the women's singles championship.
Deng Yaping defeated Ri Pun-hui in the final by three sets to nil, to win the title.

Results

See also
List of World Table Tennis Championships medalists

References

-
World